142nd Division Sustainment Support Battalion (142nd DSSB) is a multifunctional logistics headquarters. It is task organized as a Division Sustainment Support Battalion with capability required to support specified mission requirements. The CSSB supports echelon above brigade units, multifunctional brigades (maneuver enhancement brigade, field artillery brigade, and combat aviation brigade), functional support brigades (military police, signal, and engineer brigades), and brigade combat teams. The CSSB may support Army special operations forces as part of their area support task.  The 142nd DSSB is currently stationed at Fort Bliss, Texas, and is a subordinate unit of the 1st Armored Division Sustainment Brigade.

Capabilities
The role of a DSSB is to exercise mission command for task organized companies, teams, and detachments executing logistics operations. The DSSB is task organized with functional companies, teams, and detachments. It is designed to employ and control up to six company-sized units conducting logistics operations. The requirements for the number and type of units attached to a CSSB is mission dependent. Attaching additional units to a CSSB task organization may increase responsiveness but reduces agility of the CSSB specifically in the ability to provide effective mission command. See ADRP 6-0, Mission Command.

History 
13 January 1944 Constituted as Headquarters and Headquarters Detachment, 142d Quartermaster Battalion, Mobile. 
31 January 1944 activated at Camp Butner, North Carolina
1 September 1946 reorganized and redesignated as Headquarters and Headquarters Detachment, 142d Quartermaster Battalion. 
8 December 1950 allotted to the Regular Army
15 December 1962 reorganized as the 142d Quartermaster Battalion (Direct Support)
1 October 1964 inactivated at Pusan, Korea
16 March 1981 reactivated and redesignated at Wiesbaden, Germany, as Headquarters and Headquarters Company, 142d Supply and Service Battalion
25 January 1993 reorganized and redesignated as the 142d Corps Support Battalion and moved from Germany to Fort Polk, LA.
17 August 2005 142nd conducts Relief in Place for 17th Corps Support Battalion LSA Diamondback, Mosul Iraq
3 July 2006 142nd conducts Transfer of Authority to 352nd Corps Support Battalion LSA Diamondback, Mosul Iraq
15 October 2006 finally reorganized and redesignated to its current designation as the 142d Combat Sustainment Support Battalion.
1 May 2009 battalion moves from Fort Polk, LA, to Fort Bliss, TX.
26 May 2011 142nd conducts Relief in Place for the 17th Combat Sustainment Support Battalion, Bagram Airfield Afghanistan
28 April 2012 142nd conducts Transfer of Authority to the 548th Combat Sustainment Support Battalion, Bagram Airfield Afghanistan
7 August 2014 142nd conducts Transfer of Authority to the 553rd Combat Sustainment Support Battalion, Bagram Airfield Afghanistan
24 April 2021 142nd conducts Transfer of Authority to the 393rd Combat Sustainment Support Battalion, Camp Buehring, Kuwait
21 October 2021 142nd Division Sustainment Support Battalion (DSSB) companies uncased their newest guidons, Alpha Company formerly known as the 504th Composite Supply Company, Bravo Company formerly known as the 147th Support Maintenance Company, and Charlie Company formerly known as the 47th Transportation Company.
Sources:

Korean War
The Pittsburgh Press - Oct 20, 1951	Missing 'Epistle' Bronze Star Clue

Capt. Thomas H. Westermann is a letter writer with a system. First of all, he has written his wife, Mary, of 104 W. Steuben St., Crafton, every day since he left Pennsylvania Station and home last Dec. 27. Every day, that is, except one. This day has gone down on the family calendar as an eventful day. Capt. Westermann copped the Bronze Star on this occasion for heroic deeds in Korea proved his undoing. Try as he did to conceal his exploits from the family, his letter-writing system proved his undoing. Seems he numbers every letter he writes. When Mrs. Westermann last heard from him on Oct. 8, he had been away from home 285 days. Thus the note that day was labeled "Daily Epistle No. 285." Capt. Westermann, a native of Carnegie, is plans and operations officer of the 142nd Quartermaster Battalion in Korea.  His outfit operates one of the largest supply depots on this side of the 38th Parallel. The supply dump bulges with ammunition, shells, food, and vital fuel. On Feb. 11, a train loaded with ammunition and high explosive shells caught fire at the depot. In a matter of minutes, it seemed the whole dump was going to blow up. Rations, arms, and fuel which had been lugged overseas for months to put a muscle in the U.N. punch were being destroyed. Capt. Westermann refused to quit the supplies although explosions were rocking the area a mile around the dump. He and a small band of GIs braved the flying shell fragments and exploding ammo to save 43 carloads of supplies and several hundred tons of ammunition. They battled the fire 24 hours. Capt. Westermann missed writing Letter 46 that night. Next evening, before he sank into his bed, he wrote: "Dear Mary: Sorry I couldn't write last night. We had a little fire here." At the top of the note, he scribbled Nos. 46-47. "I didn't worry," Mrs. Westermann explained, "but I knew something serious had happened." A few weeks ago, she received a small box mailed from Korea. Inside was the Bronze Star. The accompanying citation, describing Capt. Westermann's bravery revealed for the first time what had happened to "Daily Epistle No. 46."

Korean Armistice
Pusan, South Korea, December, 1957: The picture to the right shows Master Sgt. Robert S. Boyd, left, and Pvt. Allen G. Ladwig check a mountain of boxes containing stored meals at the 142nd Quartermaster Battalion's Plant No. 1. The giant supply operation was responsible for, among other things,  receiving, storing and issuing all perishable foods arriving at Pusan port from the U.S., Japan and Okinawa. The 142 used 100 tons of ice and 1.5 million pounds of salt to keep everything fresh during the summer; a bakery unit attached to the battalion baked about 45,000 one-pound loaves of bread per month for troops in the Pusan Area Command.

1 May 1955, the 55th Quartermaster Base Depot was relocated to Bupyong (ASCOM city), subsequently named Camp Market. The 142nd Quartermaster Battalion was moved from Masan and assumed the mission of providing Quartermaster support to US/UN Forces in the Southern area plus Class I perishable support for all US Forces in Korea.

Operation Iraqi Freedom I

The Battalion was deployed to Iraq from 6 April 2003 to 8 April 2004.   Crossed LD ISO 3d ACR providing DS CSS to Corps units within 3d ACR task organization. Occupied Forward Log Base PECAN and supported 3d ACR and 2/3 ID throughout Al Anbar Province (MND-W). Supported the relief in place of 3d ACR and 82d ABN DIV by providing direct support to 82d combat forces until closure of the 82d Division Support Command (DISCOM). Supported non-divisional forces in 82d Task Organization, provided reinforcing support to 82d DISCOM and provided DS CSS on an area basis upon closure of the 82d DISCOM. Provided initial support to 1 MEF & 1 FSSG (USMC) during the TOA with TF 82.

Bulk Fuel Operations                                                                    
Served as liaison to COSCOM for all bulk fuel storage and distribution issues in MND-W sector  
Operated 350,000 gal bulk fuel facility on FOB RIDGWAY
Average daily issues = 30,000 gal
Deployed Fuel System Supply Point (FSSP) to two locations in support of 82d ABN DIV RSOI
Supported 1/1 IN w/ fuel distribution (5K tankers) to Junction City
Supported 82 ABN DIV CA initiatives with captured Iraqi fuel
5,375,213 total gallons distributed 
Bulk Water Operations
Served as liaison to COSCOM for all water production and storage issues in MND-W sector
Potable water production operations at Al Asad and FOB RIDGWAY
Average daily water production at FOB RIDGWAY = 140,000 gal
Storage capacity = 300,000 gal 
12,777,080 total gallons produced
Transitioned to LOGCAP water production & storage
Field Service Operations
Sole provider of military shower, laundry and clothing repair (SLCR)in MND-W sector
Had 3 additional SLCR detachments at one time
Conducted SLCR operations at 8 locations
Transitioned to LOGCAP laundry and bath operations
Completed 120,171 bundles of laundry and provided 265,213 showers
Ammunition Operations
Operated the only two ASPs in Iraq
Operated Ammo Support Activity at TAJI ISO 1AD CLV Retrograde
Ammo Support Activity established at RIDGWAY in mid-Feb ’04
Established and operated regional CEA depot until transition to contract
Supported CEA reduction efforts at FOB RIDGWAY – clearing 1,210 st
Managed over 800st CLV at RIDGWAY ASP
Maintenance Operations
602d OD Co provided DS maintenance support to non-DIV units VIC FOB RIDGWAY and back-up support to 82d DISCOM
Deployed 5 MSTs ISO 3d ID, 82d ABN DIV, and 1st AD
Provided recovery support as required throughout AO
Conducted convoy security missions for contracted trucks
Transportation Operations
Provided back-up transportation to TF 82
Provided GS transportation support as directed by 16th CSG
Routinely operated at over 75% of capability
Averaged 4-6 convoys per week
Long-term support of light forces w/ M923 5 ton cargo trucks
Supported early retrograde of equipment to Kuwait ISO of TF82 forces
Over 750,000 miles driven in Iraq

Operation Enduring Freedom III

The 142nd Corps Support Battalion deployed to LSA Daimondback Mosul Iraq in support of Operation Iraqi Freedom 05-07 between 23 July 2005 and 7 July 2006. The unit preceded the arrival of the 101° Sustainment Brigade by one month and immediately established command relationships with the 917" Corps Support Group and the I" Corps Support Command.  Over the course of the deployment over 1,400 Soldiers fell under the 142nd command and control in 15 different units spread across five locations in MND-N.  The 142nd became an integral team player and provided unmatched support to Task Force Freedom in Multi-National Forces-North West (MNF-N W) and its highly-diversified subordinates, including the 3s Armored Cavalry Regiment and 1/25 SBCT.  The unit launched on average 7 Combat Logistical Patrols every night along the IED-infested roads of northern Iraq constantly, ranging from downtown Mosul to remote sites.  The unit orchestrated incredibly detailed, comprehensive combined-arms mission sets which set the standard for Combat Service Support conduct of Combat Logistics Patrols (CLPs). It supervised the movement of Combat Logistics Patrols escorting 106,623 TCN Commercial Trucks traveling 1,746,812 miles, transporting 5,844 20 foot containers of various supplies throughout the theatre. The 142nd accomplished this with a varied unit set of Active Component (AC) and Reserve Component (RC), including two AC artillery batteries serving in lieu of transportation companies. Besides the more traditional reinforcing Direct Support (DS) to an Armored Cavalry Regiment (ACR), two consecutive Stryker Brigade Combat Teams (SBCTs) and a mechanized Brigade Combat Team (BCT), these missions also involved the daily escort of up to two 90-white-truck Third Country National (TCN) CLPs each way from the Iraqi-Turkish border with its rugged mountainous approaches to the General Support (GS) Hub for MND-N as well as the DS Hub. The unit relentlessly and meticulously sought ways to harness the latest technology in the counter-IED fight. In the process, the 142nd leadership became the Subject Matter Expert (SME) in the most effective placement and utilization of Electronic Counter-Measures (ECM). The 142nd also provided battalion-level command and control of both the internal and external Military Transition Teams (MiTTs) for the Iraqi Army (IA) 3s Division's Motorized Transportation Regiment (MIII). Under the mentorship of the 142nd the 3" MTR became the premier MTR of the Iraqi Army, a living symbol of Iraqi Soldiers serving brother Soldiers and civilians, including support during the historic 15 October 2005 Referendum and the 15 December 2005 Election.  The unit lost two soldiers during the deployment, one to a HMMWV roll over accident and another to enemy small arms fire. After the roll over incident the 142nd worked to mitigate the risk by unveiling the first and only HMWVV Egress Assistance Trainer, or HEAT, in Iraq June 14, 2006, giving the Soldiers another weapon in the safety arsenal to combat HMWVV rollovers, which claimed 13 lives throughout Iraq in 2006 alone.

Logistical Statistics
Management of 19.5 million gallons of Bulk fuel
676,189 gallons of water distribution
64,000 cases of various Class I products
61,717 receipts processed within the Supply Support Activity
7.6 million pounds of mail,
101 remains processed
45,000 Showers and
144,000 bundles of laundry
5,632 flights bringing in and out more than 10,740 pallets and 77,641 passengers
3,317 Direct Support maintenance job orders
82 off-FOB recovery missions

Operation Enduring Freedom
The Battalion deployed to Afghanistan 11 May 2011 to 3 May 2012. The multifunctional Battalion consisted of six Combat Service Support companies from multiple Army components deployed to Afghanistan consisting of 1,268 Soldiers and contract oversight of over 300 civilians. Provided direct support logistics, during the most austere challenging environments on earth; battling the harsh winters, demanding terrain, and relentless enemy; to more than 50,000 U.S. and Coalition Forces assigned to CJTF-I operating in Regional Command East (RC-E/C) to enable joint efforts in Counter Insurgency Operations. Managed 450 combat patrols, multiple company-level transitions, was responsible for the largest ammunition point in Afghanistan, thousands of containers and Host-Nation Trucks uploaded and downloaded. The Battalion was the most complex of three Battalions in the 10th Sustainment Brigade; five transportation companies moving supplies daily to sustain the momentum of the campaign, helping to grow ANSF capability and facilitating the start of retrograde of the US Army’s excess property to CONUS. Supported Operation Devil Hammer, a surge brigade build-out for an Airborne Task Force, at the height of the winter season while enduring freezing temperatures, treacherous road conditions, and heavy snowfall. Set the right conditions for success during the 2012 spring and summer fighting seasons.
The Battalion Deployed to Kandahar AB Afghanistan 1 May 2014 to 14 October 2014

Honors

Unit decorations

Campaign participation credit

Fallen Soldiers Remembered
Army Staff Sgt. Craig Davis 37, of Opelousas, Louisiana. Davis was on board a UH-60 Blackhawk helicopter when it crashed near Fallujah, Iraq while on a MEDEVAC mission. He was assigned to the 603rd Transportation Company, 142nd Corps Support Battalion, Fort Polk, Louisiana. Died on January 8, 2004.
Army 2nd Lt. Clifford V. Gadsden 25, of Red Top, South Carolina. Gadsden died in Balad, Iraq, when a vehicle-born improvised explosive device detonated near his convoy vehicle. He was assigned to the 603rd Transportation Company, 142nd Corps Support Battalion, Warrior Brigade, Fort Polk, Louisiana. Died on April 29, 2005.
Army Sgt. Frank M. Sandoval 27, of Yuma Arizona, died June 18, 2007 in Palo Alto, California, of wounds suffered when his unit was attacked in Tikrit on Nov. 28, 2005. He was assigned to Bravo Battery 2-5 FA, 142nd Corps Support Battalion, 101st Sustainment Brigade, LSA Diamondback Mosul Iraq.

Subordinate units

2021- Garrison Operations Fort Bliss
 Headquarters and Headquarters Company (HHC)
 504th Quartermaster Company
 47th Transportation Company
 68th Transportation Company
 377th Transportation Company
 606th Transportation Detachment

2020 - 2021 Kuwait Operation Spartan Shield Task Force Atlas 25 August 2020 – 24 April 2021
 Headquarters and Headquarters Company (HHC)
 47th Heavy Composite Truck Company
 154th Heavy Composite Truck Company
 236th Inland Cargo Transfer Company (IL USAR
 203rd Inland Cargo Transfer Company (MN USAR)
 1487th Transportation Company (OH NG)
 720th Transportation Company (NM NG)
 227th Composite Supply Company
 247th Composite Supply Company
 3666th Support Maintenance Company (AZ NG) "Desert Demons"
 3654th Support Maintenance Company (IA NG)
 592nd Ordnance Company (MT USAR)
 163rd Ordnance Company (CA USAR)
 151st Quartermaster Detachment (Rigger)

2014 Afghanistan Taskforce Muleskinner 1 May 2014 to 14 October 2014
 Headquarters and Headquarters Company (HHC)
 1460th Transportation Company - MI NG
 1742nd Transportation Company - SD NG
 1176th Transportation Company - TN NG
 96th Transportation Company
 111th Mortuary Affairs Team

2011-2012 Afghanistan
 Headquarters and Headquarters Company (HHC)
 131st Transportation Company (PA NG)
 109th Transportation Company
 236th Inland Cargo Transfer Company
 584th Maintenance Company
 59th Quartermaster Company

2007-2009 Operation Iraqi Freedom V/VI 13 October 2007 to 5 January 2009
 Headquarters and Headquarters Company (HHC)
 603d Transportation Light-Medium Truck Company
 1710th Transportation Company
 216th MP Company
 Company A, 39th BSB (TACON)
 Company F, 39th BSB (TACON)
 Company A, 217th BSB (TACON)
 Company B, 217th BSB (TACON)
 206th Transportation Company
46th Chemical Company

2006-2007 Garrison Operations Fort Polk, LA
 Headquarters and Headquarters Company (HHC)
 11th Public Affairs Detachment
 383 Movement Control Team
 488th Quartermaster Company
 585 Movement Control Team
 603d Transportation Light-Medium Truck Company
 546th Support Maintenance Company 
 F DET/ 18th PSB

2005-2006 LSA Diamondback Mosul Iraq  Operation Iraqi Freedom III
 Headquarters and Headquarters Company (HHC)
 Bravo Battery 2-5 Field Artillery
 Alpha Battery 1-321st Field Artillery
 872nd Maintenance Company USAR Ogden Utah
 473rd Quartermaster Company
 298th Ordnance Company
 551st Inland Cargo Transfer Company

2004-2005 Garrison Operations Fort Polk, LA
 Headquarters and Headquarters Company (HHC)
 11th Public Affairs Detachment
 C/126th Finance
 383rd Movement Control Team
 488th Force Provider Company
 585th Movement Control Team
 603d Transportation Light-Medium Truck Company
 546th Support Maintenance Company 
 E DET/ 18th PSB
 F DET/ 18th PSB
2003-2004 Operation Iraqi Freedom I, 6 April 2003 to 8 April 2004
 Headquarters and Headquarters Company (HHC)
 209th QM (DS) (-) Indiana RC
 602d Maint (DS) Ft Hood Organic to 553rd CSB
 603d TC (LMT)(-) Ft Polk Organic to 142nd CSB
 974th QM (FS)(-) Texas RC
 608th OD CO (MOADS) Ft Benning Organic to 13th CSB
 24th TC (PLS) Ft Riley Organic to 541st CSB
 2632d TC (LMT) California NG

Attachments
 C/109th ASMC (DS) Colorado RC (mobilized 24 Jan 03)
 A76/16 Sig BN (DS) Ft Hood Organic to 16 Sig BN
 PLT, 528th POL CO Ft Lewis Task organized to 7th CSG
 ROWPU TM, 326th QM CO Pennsylvania Task organized to 7th CSG
 Bag PLT, 288th QM CO Ft Lewis Task organized to 7th CSG
 SLCR TM, 430th QM (FS) Puerto Rico RC (mobilized 15 Mar 03)
1981-1993 Germany
 Headquarters and Headquarters Company (HHC) (Camp Pieri in Wiesbaden)
 24th Supply and Service Company (Giessen)
 26th Supply and Service Company (Pioneer Kaserne in Hanau)
 29th Supply and Service Company (Baumholder)
 56th Repair Parts Supply Company (Pioneer Kaserne in Hanau)
 58th General Supply Company (Schloss Kaserne in Butzbach)

1950-1953 Korean War
 Headquarters and Headquarters Company (HHC)
 549th Quartermaster Laundry Company
 20th Quartermaster Subsistence Supply Company
 ?? Pipeline Company
 550th Quartermaster Refrigerator Company
 108th Quartermaster Bakery Company Mobile

Battalion Commanders 
 LTC Richard E. Beale Jr. March 1981 — June 1982
 LTC Robert S. Hartman June 1982 — December 1984
 LTC Charles K. Ford December 1984 — January 1987
 LTC Rodney S. Okabayashi January 1987 — January 1989
 LTC Gary L. Juskowiak January 1989 — January 1991
 LTC Nancy E. Burton January 1991 — January 1993
 LTC Ronnie R. Roberts January 1993 — February 1995
 LTC Aaron B. Hayes February 1995 — February 1997
 LTC Sharon R. Duffy February 1997 — March 1999
 LTC John A. Herman March 1999 — May 2001
 LTC Mark A. Olinger May 2001 — June 2003
 LTC Michael G. Morrow June 2003 — May 2005
 LTC Ronald L. Green May 2005 — June 2007
 LTC Timothy A. McKernan June 2007 - June 2009
 LTC Peter J. Kim July 2009 - June 2011
 LTC Jose Solis June 2011 - Jan 2013
 LTC Edward Ivey January 2013 - January 2015
 LTC Raphael S. Heflin - January 2015 - December 2016 
 LTC Asuero N. Mayo Jr. December 2016 - December 2018
 LTC Ryan Swedlow  December 2018 — June 2021
 LTC Kalin M. Reardon June 2021 — Present

Command Sergeants-Major 
 Command Sergeant Major Bobby Owens 1988
 Command Sergeant Major Oscar Patton 1991-1993
 Command Sergeant Major Edward L. Johnson 2005-2007
 Command Sergeant Major James Harmon
 Command Sergeant Major Daniel
 Command Sergeant Major Eric D. Hunt October 2017 - June 2020
 Command Sergeant Major Jefferey L. Gross II June 2020 – December 2022
 Command Sergeant Major Rodrigo Reader December 2022 – Present

Distinguished Alumnus 
 MG Richard E. Beale, Jr. retired as Director of the Defense Commissary Agency (DECA) and former 142nd S&S Battalion Commander

Miscellaneous News Articles
142nd S&S Batalion's 26th S&S Company trained for Mass Burial
Cpl. William T. Westerdick

Soldiers, Families Not Alone In Maintaining Mental Health During COVID-19

Central Texas soldier hailed as hero after El Paso rampage found dead

Soldier channels training and courage during tragedy

Archived Facebook Newsfeed

References

CSSB 0142
Military units and formations established in 1941